Badam may refer to:

 Almond, in Hindi and Persian languages
 Badam River, a river of southern Kazakhstan
 Badam, Kerman, a village in Saghder Rural District, Jebalbarez District, Jiroft County, Kerman Province, Iran
 Badam-e Dan, a village in Maskun Rural District, Jebalbarez District, Jiroft County, Kerman Province, Iran
 Badam, West Azerbaijan, a village in Mokriyan-e Sharqi Rural District, in the Central District of Mahabad County, West Azerbaijan Province, Iran